Yumi Kitahara (born 8 July 1995) is a Japanese female handball player for Sony Semiconductor and the Japanese national team.

She represented Japan at the 2021 World Women's Handball Championship in Spain.

References

1995 births
Living people
Japanese female handball players